Dorchester Sports Football Club is a football club based in Dorchester, Dorset, England.

History
Ahead of the 2016–17 season, Dorchester Sports were admitted into the Dorset Premier League, following a stint in the Dorset League. Dorchester Sports entered the FA Vase for the first time in 2019–20.

Ground
The club currently groundshare with Dorchester Town at The Avenue Stadium.

Records
Best FA Vase performance: Second qualifying round, 2019–20

References

Association football clubs established in 2007
2007 establishments in England
Football clubs in England
Dorset Football League
Dorset Premier Football League
Sport in Dorchester, Dorset
Football clubs in Dorset
Hellenic Football League